Nachana Soma-natha (IAST: Nācana Somanātha) was a 14th century Telugu language poet from the Vijayanagara Empire of southern India. He translated the Sanskrit work Harivamsa into Telugu as Uttara-Harivamsamu, and also wrote the now-lost Vasanta Vilasamu, an early prabandha work.

Biography 

According to a 1344 CE inscription (alternative readings suggest different dates), the Vijayanagara king Bukka Raya I granted Penchukaladinne village, also known as Bukka-raya-puram, to Nachana Soma-natha.

In the colophons of his works, Soma-natha describes himself as a "master of structure/storytelling" (samvidhana-chakravarti) and as an "innovative poet" (navina-guna-sanathudu). According to Velcheru Narayana Rao and David Shulman, these epithets are justified: Soma-natha contributed to the transition from a Puranic style to the more intense Kavya style seen in the works of the later poets such as Srinatha.

Works 

Uttara-Harivamsamu is Soma-natha's translation of the second part of the Sanskrit text Harivamsa, with some adaptations. The text features a Puranic theme, but also exhibits an early form of the prabandha genre. According to Kandukuri Veeresalingam, it is better than Errapragada's translation of the same text. Soma-natha characterized his work as an appendix to Tikkana's Mahabharatamu, and like Tikkana, dedicated his work to the god Harihara. Veeresalingam states that Soma-natha is better than earlier poets such as Nannayya and Tikkana in some respects, such as style and language.

The 18th century poet Kasturi Ranga-kavi quotes briefly from another work attributed to Nachana Soma-natha: Hari-vilasamu or Hara-vilasamu. Ranga-kavi uses both these titles: it is possible these were two different works.

Soma-natha's Vasanta Vilasamu is a lost work, known from a mention by the 18th century poet Kuchimanchi Timma-kavi. It featured a full-fledged prabandha style.

References 

Telugu poets
14th-century Indian poets
Vijayanagara poets
Year of birth unknown
Year of death unknown
Indian male poets
Poets from Andhra Pradesh
Sanskrit–Telugu translators